Gerald Jones is a Welsh Labour Party politician.

Gerald Jones may also refer to:

 Gerald D. Jones, American politician in the state of Iowa
 Gerald Jones (philosopher), British philosopher
 Gerald Harvey Jones, American artist

See also
 Gerard Jones, American writer